Dinara Alieva (born December 17, 1980, Baku, Azerbaijan SSR)  is an Azerbaijani and Russian opera singer (soprano). She is currently a soloist at the State Academic Bolshoi Theatre of Russia, where she made her debut in 2009 as Liù in Puccini's opera Turandot. People's Artist of Azerbaijan (2018).

Biography 
Graduated from the music college in piano class. In 2004, she graduated from the Baku Academy of Music. Then she began her career at the Azerbaijan State Academic Opera and Ballet Theater where she was a soloist until 2005, singing leading roles from the soprano repertoire: Leonora (Verdi's Il trovatore), Mimi (Puccini's La Bohème), Violetta (Verdi's La Traviata), Nedda (Leoncavallo's Pagliacci).

Dinara Alieva has been a soloist at the Bolshoi Theater of Russia since 2009. The singer's repertoire at the Bolshoi Theater includes the following roles: Rosalinda (Die Fledermaus by J. Strauss) – premiere; Mimi (La Bohème by G. Puccini) – premiere; Marfa (The Tsar's Bride by N. Rimsky-Korsakov); Michaela (Carmen by G. Bizet); Violetta (La Traviata by G. Verdi); Iolanta (Iolanta by P. Tchaikovsky); Elizabeth Valois (Don Carlos by G. Verdi); Amelia (Un ballo in maschera by G. Verdi), the title part (Rusalka by A. Dvorak) – the first performer at the Bolshoi Theater.  

Among other notable achievements, Alieva participated in the concert performance of La traviata at the Thessaloniki Concert Hall, dedicated to the 30th anniversary of Maria Callas' death. On 16 September 2009, the anniversary of Maria Callas’s death, Alieva performed at the Megaron Concert Hall in Athens where she sang arias from La traviata, Tosca, Pagliacci. She participated in the gala concerts of Elena Obraztsova at the Bolshoi Theatre in 2008 and the Mikhailovsky Theatre in 2009.

Awards and prizes 

 2010 — III Prize at the Plácido Domingo’s Operalia, The World Opera Competition (Milan).
 2010 — Honored Artist of Azerbaijan (September 17, 2010) – for services to the development of Azerbaijani culture.
 2018 — People's Artist of Azerbaijan (May 27, 2018) – for services in the development of Azerbaijani culture. 
 Honour Medal from the Irina Arkhipova Foundation.

Discography

 2013 — Russian Songs & Arias (Naxos, CD)
 2014 — Pace mio Dio …(Delos Records, CD)
 2015 — Dinara Alieva in Moscow (Delos Records, DVD)
 2015 — Alieva & Antonenko (Delos Records, CD)
 2016 — Puccini: La Rondine (Magda de Civry; Deutsche Oper Berlin; Delos Records, DVD)
 2018 — Giuseppe Verdi: Messa da Requiem. In memory of Dmitri Hvorostovsky (Conductor – Yuri Temirkanov, Delos Records, CD, DVD)

References

External links

Video with Alieva
Profile of Alieva (soprano-soloist of the Bolshoi Theater)
Media about Dinara Alieva

Musicians from Baku
1980 births
Living people
Operatic sopranos
Azerbaijani sopranos
Baku Academy of Music alumni
21st-century Azerbaijani women singers
21st-century Russian women opera singers
Russian operatic sopranos
Bolshoi Theatre